Edward F. Mooney (born 1941) is an internationally noted Kierkegaard scholar. He is currently a professor of religion and philosophy at Syracuse University.
He received his B.A. in philosophy from Oberlin College (1962) and his M.A. and Ph.D. from University of California, Santa Barbara (1968). His dissertation, written under Herbert Fingarette, linked studies of philosophical themes in literature [ Dostoevsky, The Book of Job] with the turn toward persons in the work of Austin, P. F. Strawson and Iris Murdoch. Mooney was a professor of philosophy at Sonoma State University from 1975 until 2002. While there he published books on Kierkegaard and several smaller studies. He then migrated to Syracuse University where his writing expanded to include studies of American Philosophy (Cavell, Bugbee, Wilshire, Thoreau, and others). 

Mooney was president of the North American Kierkegaard Society for several years, in which capacity he lectured in Vilnia, Frankfurt, Reykjavik, Jerusalem, Ber-Shiva, Tel Aviv, Dartmouth, Johns Hopkins, Auburn, and elsewhere. He became professor emeritus at Syracuse in 2013 and during 2013–2015 was a visiting professor at Tel-Aviv and at Hebrew University, Jerusalem, teaching seminars in American Studies on Thoreau.

He presently resides and teaches in Portland, Maine. He was a regular contributor to the interdisciplinary on-line journal Zeteo. His writing exemplifies the intersections among philosophy, religion, and poetry. One finds the clarity of Anglophone ordinary language philosophy joined to issues native to existential philosophy and religion. In recent years he has turned to Melville as exemplifying an informal and episodic conversationally developed philosophy well-suited to literary exposition and wisdom, embodying what Cavell calls "passionate speech." His work has appeared in Japanese, Portuguese, French, Hebrew, and Spanish translation.

Books
 Slants of Light: Essays After Dark (privately published)
 Living Philosophy in Kierkegaard and Melville, Bloomsbury 2020
 Excursions with Thoreau: Philosophy, Poetry, Religion, Bloomsbury Academic, 2015.
 Excursions with Kierkegaard: Others, Goods, Death, and Final Faith, Bloomsbury Academic, 2012.
 Lost Intimacy in American Thought: Recovering Personal Philosophy from Thoreau to Cavell, Continuum Books, 2009.
 Kierkegaard's Repetition and Philosophical Crumbs, Editor and Introduction, Oxford World Classics, 2009.
 On Soren Kierkegaard: Polemics, Dialogue, Lost Intimacy and Time, Ashgate, 2007.
 Ethics, Love, and Faith in Kierkegaard: A Philosophical Engagement, Editor, Indiana University Press, 2008.
 Postcards Dropped in Flight, Codhill Press, 2006.
 Wilderness and the Heart: Henry Bugbee's Philosophy of Place, Presence, and Memory, Editor. Foreword by Alasdair MacIntyre, U of Georgia Press, 1999.
 Selves in Discord and Resolve: Kierkegaard's Moral-Religious Psychology from Either/Or to Sickness Unto Death, Routledge, 1996.
 Knights of Faith and Resignation: Reading Kierkegaard's Fear and Trembling, State University of New York Press, 1991.

Articles

Mooney has published over one hundred articles and reviews on Kierkegaard, Nietzsche, Camus, Cavell, Henry Bugbee, Rorty, Pippin, Melville, Thoreau, Henry James, Erik Erikson, Kristeva, and Gilligan (among others). His work has been translated into Japanese, French, Portuguese, Persian, Spanish, and Hebrew. Excerpts from "Postcards Dropped in Flight" were listed under "Best Essays of 1998" (Houghton Mifflin, 1999). He is the most cited author in The Oxford Companion of Kierkegaard, and The Cambridge Companion to Kierkegaard's Fear and Trembling.

Lectures

Mooney has given invited lectures across the USA and in Iceland, England, Germany, Israel, and Lithuania. He was invited to deliver the first Utech Memorial Lectures at the St. Olaf International Kierkegaard Conference, 2011. A Festschrift was held in his honor at the meetings of the American Academy of Religion, 2011. He is Past-President of the North American Kierkegaard Society.

See also
Alasdair MacIntyre

References

External links
 Mooney at Syracuse University
 Mooney's CV

21st-century American philosophers
Continental philosophers
Existentialists
Philosophy academics
Heidegger scholars
Kierkegaard scholars
Living people
Syracuse University faculty
Oberlin College alumni
University of California, Santa Barbara alumni
1941 births